The 2009 Indian general election in Andaman and Nicobar Islands, occurred for 1 seat in the state. BJP candidate Bishnu Pada Ray won the election from the only seat. Ray defeated Congress candidate Kuldeep Rai Sharma.

References

Andaman
Elections in the Andaman and Nicobar Islands
2000s in the Andaman and Nicobar Islands